William McIlroy may refer to:

 William McIlroy (department store), a group of department stores in England
 Bill McIlroy (footballer) (1883–1960), an Australian rules footballer
 William McIlroy (secularist) (1928–2013), a British secularist and atheist activist